The Japan PGA Match-Play Championship was a professional match play golf tournament that was held in Japan from 1975 to 2003. It was an event on the Japan Golf Tour and held at a number of different courses throughout Japan.

Tournament hosts

Winners

External links
Coverage on Japan Golf Tour's official site
Japan PGA list of winners 

Former Japan Golf Tour events
Defunct golf tournaments in Japan
Recurring sporting events established in 1975
Recurring sporting events disestablished in 2003